= FCCO =

FCCO may refer to:

- Fort Collins, Colorado, a city in Colorado and the United States
- FC Chornomorets Odesa, Ukrainian professional football club
